Rev. Francis Hermann (born c. 1856– after 1896) was an English-born American pastor, murderer and suspected serial killer. After being connected to the murder of two female church-goers in Salt Lake City, Utah, Hermann fled the city and was never seen again. He is also suspected of murdering ex-wives and two of his children.

Early life and move to America
Francis Hermann was born in England to immigrant parents of either Norwegian or Danish origin. Little is known about his years in his native country. What is known is that Hermann was very well-educated in England, and even married at some point, but his wife died under strange circumstances. Hermann moved to the U.S. in 1891, first settling in Minneapolis, Minnesota and marrying Bertha Wagner. However, Bertha was mentally unstable and was set to be moved into an asylum. Curiously, hours before her departure, she also died under mysterious circumstances, but no action was taken to investigate further.

A year later, Hermann wooed and married a Miss Lowen of Iowa, with their wedding ceremony being performed in Minneapolis. By this time, he had moved to Superior, Wisconsin, where he had become the pastor of the First Norwegian-Danish Methodist Episcopal Church. Hermann was a respected figure in Scandinavian social circles, and was even a central figure in the Ministers' Association. He and his wife lived in Superior until the fall of 1893, when they decided to relocate to Salt Lake City, Utah. Shortly after their arrival, a baby was born, but both it and the mother died under suspicious circumstances as well.

Murders

Henrietta Clawson

A native of Sweden, Clawson (or Clauson/Clausen) first arrived through Denmark in 1887. Having no relatives in the U.S., she settled in with a family named Johnson in Omaha, Nebraska. However, due to an illness, Clawson was brought over to Salt Lake City by Tillie Anderson. Anderson later returned to Omaha, but Clawson decided to remain, maintaining contact with her friends back in Nebraska through letters. Soon after Hermann arrived in Salt Lake City, her letters frequently contained allusions of their great friendship.

In September 1895, while Hermann was attending a church conference in the east, the 25-year-old Clawson was hired to look after his parsonage in the church. When he returned, business went on as usual until a few days later, when Clawson remarked to Mrs. H. H. Peterson that she was going to visit a Mrs. Hanson on Center Street. She also added that she would return in the evening and attend services, before leaving the following day to visit a female acquaintance in the country. However, that was the last time anybody saw Clawson.

Clawson's friends made several inquiries of her whereabouts to the church, and some to Hermann himself, to no avail. The case was highly unusual, as Clawson often contacted them through letters. To their surprise, Hermann wrote them a letter claiming that he had solved the mystery and had seen Mrs. Clawson in a brothel in Butte, Montana.

Strangely enough, the church's janitor, Mr. Johnson, recalled that on the day after Clawson's disappearance, Hermann asked of him to clear the pipes of the basement furnace and prepare it for a fire. The old furnace hadn't been used since it had caused a big fire years previously, but the pastor told Johnson he needed to check the pipes. Johnson followed the instructions, and when he was about to start the fire, he was stopped by Hermann, who told him that he wanted to attend to the matter by himself. During the night, Ed Johnson, a young worker who occupied a room upstairs, was overcome by the intense heat and a putrid stench coming from the furnace. He fell into an unconscious state, and had to be splashed with water in order to come back to his senses. His parents complained to Hermann about the fire, but he continued with it until 6 o'clock in the evening, when it was finally put out.

The incident was soon forgotten, and Hermann suddenly left two weeks after, claiming that he had to visit a religious conference in the east. He called upon a friend from Provo to replace him for the services, but the young man, who was an associate of Clawson, decided to check out the mouldy basement. To his surprise, in the furnace he found several interesting items under the grate in the ash receiver: two razors, an English-made butcher knife which Hermann kept in his kitchen, a garter buckle, a belt buckle and, most shockingly, human bones. Upon further examination, he noticed that there was blood on the furnace door, and the buckles were from Clawson's clothing.

Authorities were summoned, and while the bones were sent in for an examination, they also found empty charcoal sacks. Mrs. Peterson, an acquaintance of both Hermann and Clawson, remarked that she had seen Hermann carrying a large sack down to the basement, but didn't know what it contained. She also alleged that Hermann himself had told her that Clawson had made a marriage proposal to him.

Further inquiries revealed that there were two artificial teeth with metallic rivets among the ashes and that Clawson had six artificial teeth similar to the ones found. An examination by a dentist named Keyser proved the connection. Perhaps even more curiously, a trunk belonging to Clawson was found in a pawn shop, which Hermann claimed he had mailed to her by an unknown expressman. In the trunk, articles of Clawson's clothing were discovered. Not only that, it turned out that Hermann had sold the trunk himself, despite secretly receiving money amounting to $300 from the woman, presumably for safekeeping and investment. Since Hermann was known to drink heavily, as he kept various liquors in his study, it is possible that he had spent it on alcohol. On another note, shortly before his departure, the pastor had admitted to embezzling church funds, and was awaiting a verdict from the church.

Annie Samuelson
Not long after the discovery of Clawson's charred remains, Hermann was also implicated in the disappearance and likely death of Annie K. Samuelson. In contrast to Clawson, Samuelson was employed as a nursery governess in a good family, and had an aunt and other relatives in Salt Lake City. A member of Hermann's church, she left her position to work as his housekeeper, under the promise of marrying the pastor. On February 28, 1896, Samuelson told her friends that she was going to Ogden in order to marry Hermann on the following day. However, on the next morning, Hermann was in town as usual, and when inquired about Samuelson's whereabouts by John Hansen, a fellow church-goer, he told the elderly man that she was still in Ogden and did not know when she would return. Samuelson, in fact, never did return.

A few days after the discovery of Clawson's murder, a gold ring and watch belonging to Samuelson were found in a pawnbroker's shop, placed by Hermann shortly before his departure to Kansas City, Missouri. Further developments indicated that the pair were criminally intimate, as not only had Samuelson made several payments for Hermann while they were living together, she had also let him perform an abortion on her in January. 

Although it is not entirely clear how Samuelson was killed, taking into account that Hermann was heavily interested in the human anatomy and dissection, and that a box of poisonous drugs was found in his room, it is very likely that he poisoned, butchered and subsequently dismembered Samuelson's body in the church basement before disposing of the remains. Authorities noted that a few days prior to Samuelson's disappearance, the pastor had a large box made at a nearby lumber yard. They held to the theory that he stored her remains there, and shipped them off with him to Kansas City.

Despite police searching the church grounds and digging out numerous bones, some of them human, none of the remains were positively identified as those of Samuelson. Hermann's guilt was definitely proven in her murder by two separate letters, written on behalf of Rev. Ellefson and Presiding Elder Mork. In the first case, on May 6, Hermann visited the Ellefsons and gave his wife some clothes, claiming they belonged to Hermann's deceased wife. On closer inspection, some of the garments bore the initials "A. K. S." - those of Annie K. Samuelson. The same case was for Mork, of Brigham City, whose wife also found the same initials. In addition, Rev. Melby from Butte sent a letter in which he noted that Hermann had actually sold a trunk and a quantity of ladies' clothing while in Montana.

Suspected victims
Aside from killing Clawson and Samuelson, Hermann was also suspected in the deaths of several ex-wives and two of his children:
 First wife Emmeline Smith (in England) - died under suspicious circumstances in 1889. No other information is available about her death.
 Bertha Wagner and child (Minneapolis, Minnesota) - married Hermann after his arrival in 1891. Wagner was determined to be insane, and was about to be shipped off to an asylum when she and her child died mysteriously.
 Caroline Crowley (Minneapolis, Minnesota) - mysteriously disappeared in the spring of 1892. Her sister, Clara, declared that it was most likely Hermann who murdered her, as although he was repulsed by her, he had attempted to marry her nonetheless.
 Miss Lowen and child (Salt Lake City, Utah) - married in Minneapolis, and resided with her in Superior, Wisconsin until 1893. Shortly after, a child was born to the couple, but both it and the mother died under suspicious circumstances.

Escape and sightings
Not long after both Clawson and Samuelson disappeared, Hermann left Salt Lake City on May 7, his supposed destination being Kansas City, from where he would go on a religious tour to Decorah, Iowa. However, authorities from both cities were unable to locate Hermann, and a reward was announced for his immediate arrest. He was positively traced to a metro in St. Louis, and it was suggested that he was hiding out either in Cincinnati, Ohio or a small town near Indianapolis, Indiana, disguised as a florist.

Over the following year, several people were arrested on suspicion of being Hermann, but were later released when it was proven false. There are no reports concerning Hermann after 1897, and it is presumed that he escaped capture.
 D. M. Elmenberg - On June 1, 1896, George M. Nolan, reported to be either the employee of a Salt Lake City liquor house, or a California wine company, claimed to have travelled along with Hermann two days prior off the Oregon short line, and that the murderer was hiding out in Idaho. Nolan was absolutely positive the man was the pastor, but refused to give any particulars, as he wanted the $500 prize for himself. He was accompanied by Capt. Donovan and Det. Jenney to St. Anthony, where they found the man. He was actually found to be D. M. Elmenberg, a San Francisco native who bore a striking resemblance to Hermann.
 Rev. J. Orris Brown - On June 5, the Rev. J. Orris Brown was arrested in Tennessee on suspicion of being Hermann. He was first detained in Chattanooga and extradited to Cleveland, where it is last reported that he was waiting for a picture of Hermann to arrive in order for identification procedures to continue. No other reports for him exist, suggesting he was released.
 Rev. G. Wynne Richmond - In Topeka, Kansas, Richmond was arrested and was awaiting trial for sending obscene material through the mail. He was accused of being Hermann, which he denied vehemently, and was proven that they are not the same person.
 Unnamed man - In July 1897, a man was arrested in Pembroke, Ontario, Canada on suspicion of being Hermann. A detective from Salt Lake City was sent out to confirm his identity, but ended up exonerating the man, saying that a mistake had been made.

See also
 H. H. Holmes
 List of fugitives from justice who disappeared
 Theodore Durrant

General:
 List of serial killers in the United States

References

1850s births
1891 in Minnesota
1896 in Utah
1896 murders in the United States
19th-century criminals
English emigrants to the United States
Fugitives wanted by the United States
People convicted of embezzlement
Poisoners
Suspected serial killers
Year of birth unknown
Year of death unknown